Yapraklı is a village in the town of Fatsa, Turkey. It is located near downtown Fatsa and becoming an attraction for many city residents. Near the sea, there are many apartment complexes that are being built. The purpose of these complexes is for people to get away from the city environment to a quiet and green environment.

The village has a primary school, town drinking water network, electricity and landline telephone. There is a cemetery in the neighborhood.
The economy of the district is based on agriculture and animal husbandry.

Yapraklı is located at the coordinates of 41.05 latitude and 37.466 longitude.

See also
 Ordu Province

External links
 Yerel Yönetimler Portalı - General information on Yapraklı village 

Villages in Ordu Province